Duignan (archaicly Ó Duibhgeannáin) is an Irish surname, and may refer to:

Noel Duignan (born 1948), Canadian politician
Packie Duignan (died 1992), Irish flute player
Michael Duignan (born 1968), Irish hurling manager
Michael Duignan (bishop) (born 1970), Catholic bishop
Seán Duignan (born 1936), Irish journalist
Dr John Duignan (born 1946), Scottish writer

See also
Ó Duibhgeannáin

Anglicised Irish-language surnames